Warren Peters  (born July 10, 1982) is a Canadian former professional ice hockey player. An undrafted player, he played for the Calgary Flames, Dallas Stars and the Minnesota Wild.

Playing career
A native of Saskatoon, Peters played five years of junior hockey with his hometown Saskatoon Blades before turning professional in 2003, playing one year in the American Hockey League (AHL) before spending two with the Idaho Steelheads of the ECHL. He signed with the Calgary Flames in 2005 and spent four years with their minor league organization, first for the Omaha Ak-Sar-Ben Knights, then with the Quad City Flames. Peters appeared in 16 games with the Flames.

In the 2009 off-season, he left the Flames organization, signing a one-year contract with the Dallas Stars. He appeared in 11 NHL games with the Stars in  but spent most of the season with their AHL affiliate, the Texas Stars.

Following the 2009-10 season, Peters again moved on, signing a two-year deal with the Minnesota Wild. On July 1, 2012, Peters signed a one-year, two way contract with the Pittsburgh Penguins worth $600,000 at the NHL level. In the 2013–14 season, Peters returned to the Minnesota Wild organization by signing with AHL affiliate, the Iowa Wild, for their inaugural season.

Peters finished his career in Denmark's Metal Ligaen. According to TSN, Peters was criticized for placing a dangerous hit on Lasse Bang, who suffered a concussion as a result of the hit. Peters was given a six-game suspension as a result of the hit.

Personal life
Since retirement, Peters is a realtor and resides in Omaha, Nebraska, with his wife Amber and their two sons, Connor and Corbin. He is now also a coach for Fremont flyers located in Fremont NE

Career statistics

References

External links

1982 births
Calgary Flames players
Canadian ice hockey left wingers
Dallas Stars players
Houston Aeros (1994–2013) players
Sportspeople from Saskatoon
Idaho Steelheads (ECHL) players
Iowa Wild players
Living people
Minnesota Wild players
Omaha Ak-Sar-Ben Knights players
Portland Pirates players
Quad City Flames players
Saskatoon Blades players
Ice hockey people from Saskatchewan
SønderjyskE Ishockey players
Texas Stars players
Undrafted National Hockey League players
Utah Grizzlies (AHL) players
Wilkes-Barre/Scranton Penguins players
Canadian expatriate ice hockey players in Denmark